Minuscule 690 (in the Gregory-Aland numbering), ε435 (von Soden), is a Greek minuscule manuscript of the New Testament, on parchment. Palaeographically it has been assigned to the 14th century. The manuscript has complex contents. Scrivener labelled it by 594e.

Description 

The codex contains the text of the four Gospels, on 237 parchment leaves (size ). The text is written in one column per page, 21-28 lines per page.

There are no a references to the Eusebian Canons. Two rude pictures of Evangelists have been effaced. The  (titles), lectionary markings at the margin, Synaxarion, and Menologion.

According to Scrivener it is "rough and abounding with itacisms".

Text 

The Greek text of the codex is a representative of the Byzantine text-type. Kurt Aland placed it in Category V.

According to the Claremont Profile Method it represents textual family Kx in Luke 1 and Luke 20. In Luke 10 no profile was made. It is partly illegible in Luke 1.

It has some unique readings.

History 

Scrivener dated the manuscript to the 13th century, Gregory dated it to the 14th century. Currently the manuscript is dated by the INTF to the 14th century.

The manuscript was bought from Spyridion Lambros from Athens in 1859 (along with the codex 688, 689).

It was added to the list of New Testament manuscript by Scrivener (594) and Gregory (690).

It was examined by Bloomfied, Dean Burgon, and William Hatch.

The manuscript is currently housed at the British Library (Add MS 22738) in London.

See also 

 List of New Testament minuscules
 Biblical manuscript
 Textual criticism

References

Further reading 

 W. H. P. Hatch, Facsimiles and descriptions of minuscule manuscripts of the New Testament, LXXX (Cambridge, 1951).

Greek New Testament minuscules
14th-century biblical manuscripts
British Library additional manuscripts